Red Blood of Courage is a 1935 American drama film directed by John English from a screenplay by Barry Barringer.  The film stars Kermit Maynard, Ann Sheridan, and Reginald Barlow.

Plot
Sgt. Sullivan of the Royal Canadian Mounted Police goes undercover as a wanted criminal.

Cast
 Kermit Maynard as Jim Sullivan
 Ann Sheridan as Beth Henry
 Reginald Barlow as Mark Henry/Pete Drago
 Ben Hendricks as Bart Slager
 Geo. Regas as Frenchy
 Nat Carr as Dr. Meyer
 Charles King as Joe

References

External links 

American black-and-white films
Films directed by John English
1935 drama films
1935 films
Royal Canadian Mounted Police in fiction
Films set in Canada
Films based on works by James Oliver Curwood